Bárbara de Kassia Godoy Domingos (born ) is a Brazilian individual rhythmic gymnast. She is the 2022 South American Games All-around Champion. She is the first Brazilian rhythmic gymnast to qualify for All-around final at the World Championships. 

She participated at the 2019 Rhythmic Gymnastics World Championships placing 31st in the All-around competition, that was the best finish by a Brazilian gymnast since the 1975 edition, and the best position achieved by an individual Brazilian gymnast in a fully attended World Championships. She is the 2018 South American Games and 2021 Pan American Gymnastics Championship All-around silver medalist. She had her highest placement finishing 13th in All-around qualifications and finishing 17th in All-around final at the 2021 Rhythmic Gymnastics World Championships.

References

2000 births
21st-century Brazilian women
Brazilian rhythmic gymnasts
Competitors at the 2018 South American Games
Competitors at the 2022 South American Games
Living people
Gymnasts at the 2019 Pan American Games
Medalists at the 2019 Pan American Games
Pan American Games medalists in gymnastics
Pan American Games silver medalists for Brazil
South American Games gold medalists for Brazil
South American Games medalists in gymnastics
South American Games silver medalists for Brazil
Sportspeople from Curitiba